Jyotsna Vaid is a Professor of Cognition and Cognitive Neuroscience and Women's and Gender Studies at Texas A&M University.  Vaid's research examines the impact of multiple language experience by considering properties of specific languages and variability in when and how multiple languages were acquired by bilinguals. Her research has examined the processing of evidentiality in Turkish, the processing of the impersonal se construction in Spanish, and word recognition in biscriptal readers of Hindi and Urdu. She has published extensively on the cognitive and neural bases of  bilingualism.  Most notably, Vaid's research in neuropsychology has clarified the role of the two cerebral hemispheres in bilingual language processing; her work shows that early onset of bilingualism is associated with more bilateral involvement in language, in contrast to the greater left hemisphere dominance for language among single language users.  Recently she has examined cognitive and psycholinguistic aspects of informal translation experience among bilinguals, or language brokering.  Other topics on which she has published include number processing in bilinguals, creative thought (see Ref. 4), cognitive bases of humor, spatial biases in cognition arising from directional reading habits (e.g., reading from left to right vs. from right to left), self presentation in personal ads, and gender and race disparities in professional visibility in academia.

Vaid received a B.A. in biopsychology from Vassar College and an M.A. and Ph.D. from McGill University in experimental psychology under the supervision of Wallace E. Lambert.  She completed two postdoctoral fellowships, one at Michigan State University and the other jointly at the Center for Research in Language at the University of California, San Diego, and at the Salk Institute for Biological Studies, before joining Texas A&M, where she is currently a full professor in the Department of Psychological and Brain Sciences and Director of the Language and Cognition Lab (see link below). For 10 years Vaid edited the Committee on South Asian Women (COSAW) Bulletin, a feminist publication,  and in 2009 she was a co-founding Editor, along with Vivian Cook and Bene Bassetti, of the journal Writing Systems Research. In 2012, Vaid co-founded the Diversity Science Research Cluster at Texas A&M University. Vaid is a Fellow of the American Association for the Advancement of Science, and the American Psychological Association.

External links
Jyotsna Vaid's Biography
CV
Language and Cognition Lab 
In the news: The funny, then not funny, then funny again joke (2014) 
In the news: The formula for funny (2006) 
Jyotsna Vaid google scholar page: https://scholar.google.com/citations?user=dkdLMOgAAAAJ&hl=en

References
4. Ward, T., Smith, S.M., & Vaid, J. (Eds.) (1997). Creative thought: an investigation of conceptual structures and processes. American Psychological Association.

American women psychologists
21st-century American psychologists
Vassar College alumni
McGill University Faculty of Science alumni
Michigan State University alumni
University of California, San Diego alumni
University of Texas at Austin faculty
Texas A&M University faculty
Bilingualism and second-language acquisition researchers
Year of birth missing (living people)
Living people
American women academics
21st-century American women